was a Sengoku period flatland-style Japanese castle located in what is now part of Midori Ward of the city of Nagoya, Aichi in the Tōkai region of Japan.

Background
It is not known when Ōtaka Castle was built, but records indicate that Toki Yoriyasu (1318-1388), the Nanboku-chō period shugo of Owari Province made Ikeda Yoritada castellan of Ōtaka, so the castle dates to at least this time. It was later held by the Mizuno clan, but in the Tenbun era (1532-1555), the castle was controlled by Oda Nobuhide. In 1548, it was unsuccessfully attacked by the forces of Imagawa Yoshimoto. However, after Oda Nobuhide's death, it fell into Imagawa hands with the defection of Yamaguchi Noritsugu together with Narumi Castle and Kitsukake Castle, as Yamaguchi despised Nobuhide's son, Oda Nobunaga. Nobunaga responded by construction of the fortresses of Marune and Washizu in 1559, and the Imagawa responded by installing Udono Nagateru as castellan of Ōtaka. Matsudaira Motoyasu (later known as Tokugawa Ieyasu) was sent by Imagawa Yoshimoto to assist Udono Nagateru at Ōtaka, but upon hearing word of Imagawa Yoshimoto's death at the Battle of Okehazama turned instead to recover his ancestral home at Okazaki Castle and declared his independence from the Imagawa clan. 

Ōtaka Castle was abandoned soon afterwards. The site was later occupied by the residence of the hereditary karō of Owari Domain, the Shimizu clan, until the Meiji restoration.

The site is now the Otaka Castle Ruins Park, with some remnants of its kuruwa,  double moats and earthen ramparts. The site of the tenshu in the inner bailey is slightly elevated, and is now occupied by a small Shinto shrine, the Shiroyama Hachiman-sha. It is located about 10 minutes on foot from the JR Central Tōkaidō Main Line Ōdaka Station.

Gallery

See also
List of Historic Sites of Japan (Aichi)

References

External links 

 Japan Castle Guide
Midori-ku, Nagoya City home page

Castles in Aichi Prefecture
Ruined castles in Japan
History of Aichi Prefecture
History of Nagoya
Historic Sites of Japan
Owari Province